The 2021 NCAA Division II women's basketball tournament was the 39th annual tournament hosted by the NCAA to determine the national champion of Division II women's  collegiate basketball in the United States.

The Elite Eight was held at Alumni Hall at Ohio Dominican University in Columbus, Ohio from March 23–26, 2021.

Defending champions Lubbock Christian defeated Drury in the championship game, 69–59, to claim the Lady Chaps' third overall and second consecutive national title. Lubbock Christian additionally finished the season undefeated (23-0).

Qualification
A total of 48 bids were available for the tournament: 16 automatic (awarded to the champions of the sixteen Division II conferences that crowned a basketball champion after the end of the regular season) and 32 at-large. 

The field size was temporarily reduced for just the 2021 championship to account for teams and conferences that chose to not compete during the 2020–21 season due to the COVID-19 pandemic. 

Teams from six conferences (CCAA, CIAA, Northeast-10, PSAC, SIAC and 
Sunshine State) did not participate in the regular season and were ineligible for tournament bids.

The remaining bids are allocated evenly among the eight NCAA-designated regions (Atlantic, Central, East, Midwest, South, South Central, Southeast, and West). Some teams, however, were placed outside their conferences' traditional regions to ensure an even distribution of teams across all eight regionals. As a result, each regions consists of two to three automatic qualifiers (the teams who won their respective conference tournaments) and two to four at-large bids.

Automatic bids (16)

At-large bids (32)

Bracket

Atlantic Regional
 Site: Columbus, Ohio (Ohio Dominican)

Central Regional
 Site: Warrensburg, Missouri (Central Missouri)

East Regional
 Site: Amherst, New York (Daemen)

Midwest Regional
 Site: Springfield, Missouri (Drury)

South Regional
 Site: Dahlonega, Georgia (North Georgia)

Southeast Regional
 Site: Jefferson City, Tennessee (Carson-Newman)

South Central Regional
 Site: Canyon, Texas (West Texas A&M)

West Regional
 Site: Grand Junction, Colorado (Colorado Mesa)

Elite Eight
Site: Alumni Hall, Columbus, Ohio

See also
 2021 NCAA Division I women's basketball tournament
 2021 NCAA Division III women's basketball tournament
 2021 NAIA women's basketball tournament
 2021 NCAA Division II men's basketball tournament

References

 
NCAA Division II women's basketball tournament
NCAA Division II women's basketball tournament
NCAA Division II women's basketball tournament